The Sakarya gudgeon (Gobio sakaryaensis) is a species of gudgeon, a small freshwater in the family Cyprinidae. It is found only in the Tozman Stream and Sakarya River in Turkey. It is a freshwater subtropical demersal fish, up to 11.5 cm long.

References

 

sakaryaensis
Fish described in 2012
Fish of Western Asia
Endemic fauna of Turkey